Alliet Mariana Bautista Bravo (born 19 January 1968) is a Mexican politician affiliated with the PRD. She currently serves as Deputy of the LXII Legislature of the Mexican Congress representing the Federal District. She also served as Deputy during the LX Legislature.

References

1968 births
Living people
Politicians from Mexico City
Women members of the Chamber of Deputies (Mexico)
Party of the Democratic Revolution politicians
21st-century Mexican politicians
21st-century Mexican women politicians
National Autonomous University of Mexico alumni
Deputies of the LXII Legislature of Mexico
Members of the Chamber of Deputies (Mexico) for Mexico City